Masihabad may refer to:
 Masihabad, Semnan